William G. Giaccio (March 8, 1924 – January 30, 2000) was an American politician who served in the New York State Assembly from Queens's 5th district from 1949 to 1962.

References

1924 births
2000 deaths
Democratic Party members of the New York State Assembly
20th-century American politicians